The 2005–06 A1 Grand Prix season was the inaugural season for the A1 Grand Prix series. It began on 25 September 2005, and finished on 2 April 2006 after eleven races.

This first season was won by A1 Team France on 12 March 2006.

Teams
25 teams, each representing a different country, signed up for the first A1 Grand Prix season. All teams used a control chassis (Lola A1GP), engine (Zytek) and tyre (Cooper Avon). The following teams competed in the 2005–06 championship:

 (1) Enrico Toccacelo became the replacement driver for A1 Team Pakistan in Durban after Adam Khan was injured during the practice session. Because of this, Pakistan would be ineligible to score any points in the round even if Toccacelo had finished in top 10.
 (2) A1 Team Indonesia was unable to participate in the Australian round as the team did not find a replacement driver in time to take the place of Ananda Mikola, who had instead participated in the Asian F3 Series in Batangas.

Races
The first A1 Grand Prix season consisted of 11 races, all held in different countries. Each race ran over a three-day weekend, including a practice session on each of Friday and Saturday before a qualifying session on Saturday, and then two races on Sunday.

The Indonesian Round had originally been scheduled to be held on 15 January 2006, but was postponed due to the death of Sheikh Maktoum bin Rashid Al Maktoum. The replacement date was set as 12 February 2006 (originally scheduled for the cancelled Curitiba race), resulting in effectively switching order with the South African round.

Standings

References

External links 

 Officials season standings and results at results.a1gp.com

 
A1 Grand Prix
A1 Grand Prix
A1 Grand Prix
A1 Grand Prix